William Murray is a Northern Irish international lawn and indoor bowler.

Bowls career
Murray started bowling aged just 14 and won a bronze medal in the triples at the 1976 World Outdoor Bowls Championship in Johannesburg.

He won the 1975 singles title at the Irish National Bowls Championships when bowling for the Portrush Bowls Club.

References

Living people
Male lawn bowls players from Northern Ireland
1940 births